Baishe may refer to:

Bai Suzhen, mythical character from the Chinese legend Madame White Snake
White Snake (film), 2019 Chinese film based on the legend
Baishe, Jiangxi, a town in Nanfeng County, Jiangxi, China
Baishe Township, Lanxi, Zhejiang, China

See also
Baishe Srabon, 2011 Indian Bengali film